Tischeria ceanothi is a moth of the  family Tischeriidae. It is known from California and Nevada in the United States.

The larvae feed on Ceanothus crassifolius, Ceanothus divaricatus, Ceanothus integerrimus, Ceanothus thyrsiflorus and Ceanothus velutinus. They mine the leaves of their host plant.

References

External links
mothphotographersgroup

Tischeriidae
Moths of North America
Fauna of the California chaparral and woodlands
Moths described in 1890